Altitude was the only studio album to date released by ALT, the grouping of Tim Finn, Andy White & Liam O'Moanlai. Also released was a live recording simply called Bootleg.

Track listing

Charts

References

ALT (band) albums
1995 albums
Cooking Vinyl albums